Bulbophyllum sect. Trias is a section of the genus Bulbophyllum.

Description
Species in this section are rhizomatous with a single flower arising below the pseudobulb.

Distribution
Plants from this section are found in the Indian Subcontinent, Indochina, Borneo and the Andaman & Nicobar Islands.

Species
Bulbophyllum section  Trias comprises the following species:

References

Orchid subgenera